Four Points is a census-designated place (CDP) in Webb County, Texas, United States. This was a new CDP formed from parts of the Botines CDP prior to the 2010 census with a population of 18.

It is one of several colonias in the county.

Geography
Four Points is located at  (27.796407, -99.454824).

Education
Residents are in the United Independent School District. Zoned schools include: San Isidro Elementary School, Elias Herrera Middle School, United High School.

The designated community college for Webb County is Laredo Community College.

References

Census-designated places in Webb County, Texas
Census-designated places in Texas